Horseshoe Bay is a bay on the south-east coast of the Isle of Wight, England. It lies to the south-east of the village of Bonchurch. It should not be confused with a similarly named bay about  along the shoreline to the north near Culver Down.

Seawall

The coast of the bay is lined by a concrete seawall, built in 1988 to protect a promenade and the weak chalky cliff-face from erosion. The seawall comprises a set of steps at the base of the wall, a reinforced concrete berm and stepped apron and finally a curved wave return wall. The Isle of Wight Coastal Path runs along the length of this seawall.

References

Bays of the Isle of Wight